(born 4 January 1953) is a Japanese basketball player. He competed in the men's tournament at the 1976 Summer Olympics.

References

1953 births
Living people
Japanese men's basketball players
Olympic basketball players of Japan
Basketball players at the 1976 Summer Olympics
Place of birth missing (living people)